Antoine Colassin (born 26 February 2001) is a Belgian professional footballer who plays as a striker for Eredivisie club Heerenveen, on loan from Anderlecht.

Club career
On 30 August 2022, Colassin joined Heerenveen in the Netherlands on a season-long loan with an option to buy.

Career statistics

References

External links

2001 births
People from Ottignies-Louvain-la-Neuve
Sportspeople from Walloon Brabant
Living people
Belgian footballers
Belgium youth international footballers
Belgium under-21 international footballers
Association football midfielders
R.S.C. Anderlecht players
R. Charleroi S.C. players
SC Heerenveen players
RSCA Futures players
Belgian Pro League players
Challenger Pro League players
Eredivisie players
Belgian expatriate footballers
Expatriate footballers in the Netherlands
Belgian expatriate sportspeople in the Netherlands